Kurak is a village at a 4 kilometers distance from Sibi city of Balochistan, Pakistan. The Kurak Town is the head quarter of Panni Tribe and ancestral village of Nawab barozai.

See also
 Sibi District
 Mehergarh
 Sevi
 Bibi Nani
 khajjak
 Dehpal
 Marghazani

References

Populated places in Sibi District